Pamplona, officially the Municipality of Pamplona, is a 4th class municipality in the province of Cagayan, Philippines. According to the 2020 census, it has a population of 24,781 people.

History
Pamplona is the result of the fusion of two villages during the Spanish era; Abulacan (now barrio San Juan) and Masi. Abulacan was founded by the ecclesiastical authorities on April 30, 1757, with San Juan Nepomuceno as the patron saint. Sometime in 1842, Vicar Pedro Montenegro, O.P. convinced the people to unite the two towns. The vicar named it "Pamplona" in memory of his hometown Pamplona in Spain.

After the fusion, an agreement was made that there would be two patron saints of Pamplona: San Juan Nepomuceno and San Pedro de Martir. This is the reason why the town fiesta is celebrated for two days and the images of the two patron saints are carried during religious processions. The town fiesta is celebrated every April 29.

In 1919, some of the prominent people of Pamplona recommended the transfer of the same to Bidduang, a barrio of Pamplona. The transfer was made on November 16, 1919, during the administration of municipal president Esteban Meneses by order of General Wood. In 1928, on the sixth year of the administration of municipal president Paulino Ifurung, one of his last acts was the transfer of the municipal government back to its old site, Pamplona, by then called "Albano."

Most interesting spot is the mouth of the Pamplona River. It saw history in the making for it was the starting point of Salcedo and his conquistadores when they explored Cagayan in 1572. Because of the river's strong current and unpredictable floods, Mayor Nicolas B. Aquino built in 1955 a concrete levee along Barangay Masi. He also built an irrigation system. It was the first of its kind in Cagayan.

The town is also noted for its Malagabavi Cave and waterfall. It is located at the foot of a mountain virtually shaped like a pig. Legend has it that this cave was used by a giant as an entrance to his abode. It is said that he was a normal being like a human until his transformation to a giant by a goddess who fell in love with him.

Geography

Barangays
Pamplona is politically subdivided into 18 barangays. These barangays are headed by elected officials: Barangay CaptainCaptain, Barangay Council, whose members are called Barangay Councilors. All are elected every three years.

Climate

Demographics

Economy

Government
Pamplona, belonging to the second legislative district of the province of Cagayan, is governed by a mayor designated as its local chief executive and by a municipal council as its legislative body in accordance with the Local Government Code. The mayor, vice mayor, and the councilors are elected directly by the people through an election which is being held every three years.

Elected officials

Education
The Schools Division of Cagayan governs the town's public education system. The division office is a field office of the DepEd in Cagayan Valley region. The office governs the public and private elementary and public and private high schools throughout the municipality.

References

External links
[ Philippine Standard Geographic Code]
Philippine Census Information

Municipalities of Cagayan